Cumana (Kumaná) is a possibly extinct Chapacuran language.  Various names ascribed to the language in Campbell (2012) are Torá, Toraz (distinguish Torá language), and Cautario, the last perhaps after the local river, and Abitana-Kumaná (distinguish Abitana dialect).

In addition, there is a Chapacuran language called Kujubim (Kuyubí, Cojubím), which may still be spoken. The endonym, Kaw To Yo (or Kaw Tayó, which means 'eaters of payara fish'), may be the source of the river and language name Cautario.  Sources which list one do not list the other, so these may be the same language.

Vocabulary
Conjubim vocabulary from Sampaio & da Silva (2011):

{| class="wikitable sortable"
! gloss !! Conjubim
|-
| ‘I (1sg)’ || pa
|-
| ‘thou (2sg)’ || ma
|-
| ‘we (1pl)’ || ti
|-
| ‘many’ || napa
|-
| ‘one’ || tan
|-
| ‘two’ || wakoran
|-
| ‘big’ || pu
|-
| ‘small’ || pe
|-
| ‘woman’ || tana'man
|-
| ‘man (adult male human)’ || namankon
|-
| ‘child’ || rato
|-
| ‘person (individual human)’ || piten
|-
| ‘bird’ || pune
|-
| ‘dog’ || kinam
|-
| ‘louse (lice)’ || piw
|-
| ‘tree’ || pana
|-
| ‘seed (n)’ || tukayn
|-
| ‘leaf (botanics)’ || tan
|-
| ‘root (botanics)’ || toka ijn pana
|-
| ‘meat/flesh’ || nawa zip
|-
| ‘blood (n)’ || wik
|-
| ‘bone’ || pat
|-
| ‘egg’ || pariz
|-
| ‘fat (organic substance)’ || mapum
|-
| ‘horn’ || tataw
|-
| ‘tail’ || kipun
|-
| ‘hair (of head)’ || tunam upek
|-
| ‘head (anatomic)’ || pupek
|-
| ‘ear’ || tenetet
|-
| ‘eye’ || tok
|-
| ‘nose’ || pul
|-
| ‘tooth (general)’ || jat
|-
| ‘tongue (anatomical)’ || kapajak
|-
| ‘fingernail’ || tupi
|-
| ‘foot (not leg)’ || tinak
|-
| ‘knee’ || toko zimtinak
|-
| ‘hand (not arm)’ || pepeje tipan
|-
| ‘belly (abdomen, stomach)’ || takawta
|-
| ‘heart (organ)’ || tuku rutim
|-
| ‘liver’ || tawan
|-
| ‘drink (v)’ || tok
|-
| ‘eat’ || kaw
|-
| ‘bite (v)’ || kiw
|-
| ‘ash(es)’ || pop
|-
| ‘burn (tr. v)’ || pop
|-
| ‘see (v)’ || kirik
|-
| ‘hear (v)’ || rapat
|-
| ‘sleep (v)’ || pupiyn
|-
| ‘die (v)’ || pinĩ
|-
| ‘kill (v)’ || puru
|-
| ‘swim (v)’ || mara kujan
|-
| ‘fly (v)’ || ze
|-
| ‘walk (v)’ || wana
|-
| ‘lie (recline) (v)’ || titim
|-
| ‘sit (v)’ || pe
|-
| ‘stand (v)’ || pak
|-
| ‘give (v)’ || ni
|-
| ‘sun’ || mapitõ
|-
| ‘moon’ || panawo
|-
| ‘star’ || pipojõ
|-
| ‘water (n)’ || kom
|-
| ‘rain (n)’ || pipan narikom
|-
| ‘sand’ || tinak
|-
| ‘earth (soil, ground)’ || tinak
|-
| ‘tobacco’ || ju'e
|-
| ‘fire’ || pite
|-
| ‘red (colour)’ || siwí
|-
| ‘white (colour)’ || towa
|-
| ‘night’ || pisim
|-
| ‘warm’ || nok
|-
| ‘cold’ || tiw
|-
| ‘full’ || pẽpe
|-
| ‘good’ || nami
|-
| ‘round’ || pu
|}

A word list with 793 lexical items is also available from Rodrigues Duran (2000).

Bibliography
Duran, Iris Rodrigues. 2000. Descrição fonológica e lexical do dialeto Kaw Tayo (Kujubi) da língua Moré. MA thesis, Guajará-Mirim: Universidade Federal de Rondônia; 136pp.
Angenot, Geralda de Lima V. 1997. vDocumentação da língua Kuyubi: Arquivos acústicos. Guajará-Mirim: UNIR Working Papers in Amerindian Linguistics. Série 'Documentos de Trabalho'.
Angenot, Geralda de Lima V. and Angenot, Geralda de Lima V. 1997. Léxico Português-Kuyubi e Kuyubi-Português''. Guajará-Mirim: UNIR Working Papers in Amerindian Linguistics.

References

Chapacuran languages